The Silver Cord is a 1933 American pre-Code film produced and released by RKO Radio Pictures, directed by John Cromwell, and based on a 1926 Broadway play, The Silver Cord by Sidney Howard, that starred Laura Hope Crews as an overly possessive mother.

Crews reprises her domineering mother role in this film with Joel McCrea and Irene Dunne as her son and daughter-in-law. Another Hollywood film dealing with an overbearing mother figure was Broken Laws (1924), produced by and starring Dorothy Davenport.

Plot summary

Cast
 Irene Dunne - Christina Phelps
 Joel McCrea - David Phelps
 Laura Hope Crews - Mrs. Phelps
 Eric Linden - Robert Phelps
 Frances Dee - Hester

unbilled
 Helen Cromwell - Delia
 Paul Irving - Taxicab Driver
 Perry Ivins - Phelps Family Doctor
 Reinhold Pasch - Lab Technician
 Gustav von Seyffertitz - German Doctor

Production
Director John Cromwell welcomed the opportunity to adapt The Silver Cord to the screen as he had directed Sidney Howard’s play in its 1926 Broadway production. Film historian Kingsley Canham reports that Crowell “felt that he could pull it off better than any other [film] director.” 

Joel McCrea and Frances Dee first met during filming, and would be married soon after in October 1933.  They remained married for 57 years, until McCrea's death.

Footnotes

References
 Canham, Kingsley. 1976. The Hollywood Professionals, Volume 5: King Vidor, John Cromwell, Mervyn LeRoy. The Tantivy Press, London.

External
 
 
 
 
 1946 Theatre Guild on the Air radio adaptation of original play at Internet Archive

1933 films
American films based on plays
Films directed by John Cromwell
1933 romantic drama films
American romantic drama films
American black-and-white films
Films with screenplays by Jane Murfin
1930s American films